Alfred Louis Stewart Jackson (28 February 1904 – 23 July 1982) was an Argentinian and Chilean cricketer. A right-handed batsman and wicket-keeper, he played for both Chile and Argentina, and also played first-class cricket for a combined South America side and for Argentina. His elder brother John played for Somerset.

Playing career

Jackson played one match for Chile, a three-day match against Argentina in 1925. Opening the batting with his brother, he scored 109 in the Chile first innings, but this wasn't enough to prevent Argentina winning by 320 runs.

He eventually moved to Argentina and played his first North v South match there in February 1932, a fixture he would play in nine times in total. In the 1932 English cricket season, he toured with a combined South American side, playing first-class matches against Oxford University, Leicestershire, Sir J Cahn's XI, Sussex and Scotland. He topped the batting averages on the tour, and his innings of 78 against Julien Cahn's XI was his highest career first-class score.

Returning to Argentina, he played three further first-class matches, this time for Argentina in 1937/38, against Sir TEW Brinckman's XI. Argentina drew the series 1-1, with Jackson captaining the Argentina team. He played his final internationals for Argentina on a tour of Chile in December 1938. Argentina won both matches, the second of which saw Jackson playing against his brother John, who was playing for Chile.

References

Argentine cricketers
Chilean cricketers
Sportspeople from Viña del Mar
1904 births
1982 deaths
Argentine people of British descent
Chilean people of British descent
Chilean emigrants to Argentina
South Americans cricketers